John VIII, Count of Nassau-Siegen (Jan or Johan; Dillenburg, 29 September 1583 – Ronse, 27 July 1638) was a German nobleman and militarist of the 17th century.

Life 
John VIII, Count of Nassau-Siegen, Katzenelnbogen, Vianden and Dietz, Marquis of Monte-Caballo, Baron of Ronse and Beilstein, was the second son of John VII, Count of Nassau-Siegen and Countess Magdalene of Waldeck-Wildungen.

He was educated in Herborn, Kassel and Geneva. In 1610 he participated in the Dutch States Army in the conquest of Jülich.

On 25 December 1613, much to the horror of his family, he openly converted to Catholicism and entered in the service of the army of Charles Emmanuel I, Duke of Savoy. After the death of his elder brother, John Ernest in September 1617, he claimed his rights, but his father chose a Protestant successor. When his father died in 1623, John VIII occupied Nassau-Siegen at the head of a Habsburg Army and started the Contra-Reformation.

In 1624 he became a Knight in the Order of the Golden Fleece.

In 1625 he participated in the Siege of Breda. Breda was defended by his second cousin Justinus van Nassau and held out for eleven months before surrendering. John VIII of Nassau-Siegen is depicted in the famous painting The Surrender of Breda by Diego Velázquez, third from the left in the Spanish camp, looking directly at the spectator.

In 1630 he was captured by the Dutch Army, however, he was released later that year for a huge bail. In 1631, he was in charge of the Spanish-Flemish Fleet defeated by the Dutch and Scots and English mercenaries, at the Battle of the Slaak, fighting on behalf of the Spanish Governor Francisco de Moncada, 3rd Marquis of Aitona, (1586–1635).

In 1632, Nassau-Siegen was conquered by the Swedes, after which his half-brother John Maurice of Nassau-Siegen re-introduced Protestantism.

John VIII died in 1638 and was succeeded by his only son Johan Frans Desideratus, who had to cede part of Nassau-Siegen to the Protestant branch of the family.

Marriage and children 

John was married in Brussels on 13 August 1618 to the Catholic princess Ernestine Yolande de Ligne d'Amblise (1594–1668), daughter of Lamoral de Ligne, Prince d'Espinoy. They had six children together:
 Maria (1619–1620)
 stillborn daughter (1620)
 Clara Maria (1621–1695), married with her cousins Prince Albert Henri de Ligne in 1634, and with Claude Lamoral, 3rd Prince of Ligne in 1642
 Ernestine Charlotte (1623–1668), married in 1650 with Maurice Henry, Prince of Nassau-Hadamar
 Lamberta Alberta Gabrielle Ursula (1625–1635)
 John Francis Desideratus (Nozeroy, 1627 – Roermond, 1699), Count of Nassau-Siegen

Ancestors

External links 
Tercios.org 

1583 births
1638 deaths
Converts to Roman Catholicism
Counts of Nassau
Nassau-Siegen, John VIII of
House of Nassau-Siegen
People from Dillenburg
Generals of the Holy Roman Empire
Military personnel from Hesse